Sciota rhenella is a moth of the family Pyralidae. It was described by Johann Leopold Theodor Friedrich Zincken in 1818 and is found in Europe.

The wingspan is 22–24 mm. The moth flies in one generation from May to August .

The caterpillars feed on poplar.

Notes
The flight season refers to Belgium and The Netherlands. This may vary in other parts of the range.

External links
 waarneming.nl 
 Lepidoptera of Belgium 
 

Phycitini
Moths described in 1818
Moths of Europe
Taxa named by Johann Leopold Theodor Friedrich Zincken